Ivo Dos Santos (born 20 October 1985 in Lisbon, Portugal) is an Australian judoka. At the 2012 Summer Olympics he competed in the Men's 66 kg, but was defeated in the second round by Colin Oates from Great Britain.  He has won four Australian National Judo titles.

References

External links 

London 2012 profile

Australian male judoka
1985 births
Living people
Olympic judoka of Australia
Judoka at the 2012 Summer Olympics
Portuguese emigrants to Australia
Sportspeople from Lisbon